This is a list of real and fictional people with the surname Carpenter.

 See Carpenter (surname) for the etymology and related names.
 See Carpenter (disambiguation) for Carpenter named communities, natural features, and manmade features.
 See Carpenter House (disambiguation) for houses, homes, shops, homesteads, farmsteads, or other partially named or hyphenated named places with "Carpenter" or a similar meaning name.

Common combinations of given name and surname Carpenter

Aaron Carpenter (disambiguation)
Andrew Carpenter (disambiguation)
Arthur Carpenter (disambiguation)
Bobby or Bob Carpenter (disambiguation)
Brian Carpenter (disambiguation)
Charles Carpenter (disambiguation)
Chris Carpenter (disambiguation)
Christine Carpenter (disambiguation)
Christopher Carpenter (disambiguation)
Daniel Carpenter (disambiguation)
David or Dave Carpenter (disambiguation)
Donald Carpenter (disambiguation)
Ed Carpenter (disambiguation)
Edmund Carpenter (disambiguation)
Francis Carpenter (disambiguation)
Frank Carpenter (disambiguation)
Franklin Carpenter (disambiguation)
George Carpenter (disambiguation)
Harry Carpenter (disambiguation)
Henry Carpenter (disambiguation)
Horace Carpenter (disambiguation)
Isaac Carpenter (disambiguation)
Jack Carpenter (disambiguation)
James Carpenter (disambiguation)
John Carpenter (disambiguation)
Joseph Carpenter (disambiguation)
Ken Carpenter (disambiguation)
Lewis or Lew Carpenter (disambiguation)
Louis Carpenter (disambiguation)
Maggie Carpenter (disambiguation)
Margaret Carpenter (disambiguation)
Mary Carpenter (disambiguation)
Matthew Carpenter (disambiguation)
Michael Carpenter (disambiguation)
Nathaniel Carpenter (disambiguation)
Paul Carpenter (disambiguation)
Philip Carpenter (disambiguation)
Richard Carpenter (disambiguation)
Robert Carpenter (disambiguation)
Ron Carpenter (disambiguation)
Sam or Samuel Carpenter (disambiguation)
Scott Carpenter (disambiguation)
Stephen Carpenter (disambiguation)
Ted Carpenter (disambiguation)
Thomas Carpenter (disambiguation)
William Carpenter (disambiguation)

Less ambiguous notable individuals

A
 Albert J. Carpenter (1911–1999), Rear Admiral in the United States Coast Guard
 Alan Carpenter (born 1957), Australian politician
 Alexander Carpenter, Latinized as Fabricius (fl.1429) 
 Alexandra Carpenter (born 1994), American ice hockey player
 Alfred Carpenter (1881–1955), British naval officer, Vice-Admiral and Victoria Cross recipient
 Allan Carpenter (1917–2003), American non-fiction writer
 Allie May "A.M." Carpenter (1887–1978), artist and art educator
 Almeria Carpenter (1752–1809) British courtier and mistress of Prince William Henry, Duke of Gloucester and Edinburgh
 Amanda Carpenter (born 1982), American author and columnist for The Washington Times
 Archibald Boyd-Carpenter (1873–1937), British politician
 Aurelius O. Carpenter (1836–1919), American photographer, writer and abolitionist

B
 B. Platt Carpenter (1837–1921), Governor of Montana Territory from 1884 to 1885
 Benajah Carpenter (1748–1776), founding member of the US Army Field Artillery Corps
 Benjamin Carpenter (1725—1804), Revolutionary War Colonel, leader of colonial Vermont constitution and Lt. Governor. 
 Benjamin Carpenter (British Army officer) (c. 1713/14–1788), British army officer
 Bill Carpenter (born 1937), American football player and army officer
 Boyden Carpenter (1909–1995), American Hillbilly and Bluegrass musician

C
 Cameron Carpenter (born 1981), American organist
 Candi Carpenter (fl. 2010s), American country music singer-songwriter
 Carleton Carpenter (1926–2022), American movie, TV and stage actor, magician, author, and songwriter
 Catherine "Kate" Carpenter (c. 1730s–1784), Virginia pioneer for whom Kate's Mountain is named
 Cecelia Svinth Carpenter (1924–2010), historian of the Nisqually people
 Chad Carpenter (born c. 1968), American cartoonist
 Charisma Carpenter (born 1970), American actor
 Christina Carpenter (fl. 1329–1332), 14th-century anchoress
 Clarence E. "Pete" Carpenter (1914–1987), American jazz trombonist, musical arranger, and television theme song scorer
 Clarence Ray Carpenter (1905–1975), American primatologist
 Claude E. Carpenter (1904–1976), American set decorator
 Cliff Carpenter (1915–2014), American actor
 Connie Carpenter-Phinney (born 1957), American professional cycle racer and speed skater
 Constance Carpenter (1904–1992), English-born American film and musical theatre actor
 Coy Cornelius Carpenter (1900–1971), physician and dean of the School of Medicine of Wake Forest University
 Cyrus C. Carpenter (1829–1898), Civil War veteran, Republican governor of Iowa, U.S. Representative from Iowa

D
 Dan Carpenter (born 1985), American football placekicker
 Daniel C. Carpenter (1815–1866), early New York police detective
 David Aaron Carpenter, New York violist
 Davis Carpenter (1799–1878), U.S. Representative from New York
 Delphus E. Carpenter (1877–1951), Colorado state senator and water rights lawyer
 Don Carpenter (1931–1995), American writer
 Don Carpenter (fl. 1960s), electrical engineer, discoverer of the plasmasphere
 Donald F. Carpenter (1899–1985), American businessman and government official
 Doug Carpenter (born 1942), hockey coach
 Drew Carpenter (born 1985), American baseball pitcher 
 Dudley Newcomb Carpenter (1874–1955), doctor, U.S. Navy officer, writer

E
 Edwin Francis Carpenter (1898–1963), American astronomer
 Elbert L. Carpenter (1862–1945), lumberman who helped organize the Minneapolis Symphony Orchestra, namesake of Elbert L. Carpenter House
 Ellie Carpenter (born 2000), Australian footballer
 Elisabeth Carpenter Satterthwait (born 1856), author
 Eliza Carpenter (1851–1924), early African-American race horse owner
 Elizabeth Carpenter (born 1953), American writer, designer, and game developer
 Ensley A. Carpenter (c. 1819–before 1910), doctor for whom the town of Carpenter, Kentucky was named
 Ernie Carpenter (1907–1997), West Virginia fiddle player

F
 Flavius Josephus Carpenter (1851–1933), Arkansas veteran of the Civil War, steamboat captain, entrepreneur
 Florence Carpenter Dieudonné (1850–1927), early science fiction and fantasy writer
 Frances Carpenter (1890–1972), American photographer and author
 Francis Bicknell Carpenter (1830–1900), 19th century American painter
 Francis M. Carpenter (1834–1919), New York politician
 Frank G. Carpenter (1855–1924), 1920s travel guide author
 Frank M. Carpenter (1902–1994), paleoentomologist & curator of fossil insects at the Harvard Museum of Comparative Zoology 
 Franklin R. Carpenter (1848–1910), 19th century American mining engineer
 French Carpenter (1899–1965), West Virginia fiddle player

G
 Gail Carpenter (born 1948), a cognitive scientist, neuroscientist, mathematician and adaptive resonance theory pioneer
 Geoffrey Douglas Hale Carpenter (1882–1953), British entomologist and evolutionary biologist
 Gordon Carpenter (1919–1988), American basketball player
 Grace Carpenter Hudson (1865–1937), American painter
 Grant Carpenter (1865–1936), American newspaperman, lawyer, and writer

H
 Harlean Carpenter, better known as Jean Harlow (1911–1937), American film actor
 Harry Carpenter (1925–2010), BBC sports commentator
 Harry Carpenter (bishop) (1901–1993), warden of Keble College, Oxford and 37th Bishop of Oxford
 Helen Knipe Carpenter (1881–1959), illustrator and writer 
 Henry Bernard Carpenter (1840–1890), Unitarian clergyman and poet
 Herbert Carpenter (1869–1933), English cricketer
 Hermon P. Carpenter (1877–1958), early Florida educator
 Hick Carpenter (1855–1937), American Major League Baseball third baseman
 Holly Carpenter (born 1991), Miss Ireland 2011
 Horace B. Carpenter (1875–1945), American actor, director, and screenwriter
 Horace Thompson Carpenter (1857–1947), artist and illustrator
 Humphrey Carpenter (1946–2005), English biographer, author and radio broadcaster

I
 Imogen Carpenter (born Mary Imogene Carpenter; 1912–1993), American musician and actress
 Isaac Carpenter (drummer) (born 1979), American drummer, percussionist, producer, audio engineer and session musician
 Isaac M. Carpenter (1920–1998), American jazz musician and bandleader of the 1940s and 1950s

J
 J. D. Carpenter (born 1948), Canadian poet and crime novelist
 J. L. Carpenter (1839–1919), American politician
 J. R. Carpenter (born 1972), Canadian artist, writer and performer 
 Jack Carpenter (American football) (1923–2005), American football player
 Jake Burton Carpenter (1954–2019), owner of Burton Snowboards
 Jay Hall Carpenter (born 1961), sculptor
 Jean Anne Carpenter, also known as Jean Carnahan (born 1933), American politician and writer
 Jeanne Carpenter (1917–1994), American child actor of the silent era
 Jeff Carpenter (fl. 2000s–2010s), Native American musician
 Jennifer Carpenter (fl. 1990s–2020s), American actor
 Joel Carpenter, pseudonym of Arnold Manoff (1914–1965), American screenwriter
 Joseph Estlin Carpenter (1844–1927) Unitarian minister and pioneer in the study of comparative religion
 Josh Carpenter (born 1979), American actor
 Jot D. Carpenter (1938–2000), American landscape architect
 Joyce Carpenter (1923−2016), New Zealand diver
 Juliet Winters Carpenter (born 1948), translator of modern Japanese literature into English
 Julius Angelo Carpenter (1827–1880), American manufacturer and politician
 Justin Carpenter (fl. 2010s), a game developer known for making Harms Way (video game)

K
 Karen Carpenter (1950–1983), singer and musician, half of The Carpenters
 Kathleen E. Carpenter (1891–1970), British freshwater ecologist
 Katie Carpenter (fl. 2010s–2020s), American actress, costume designer, and film producer
 Keion Carpenter (1977–2016), American football defensive back
 Keith Carpenter (born 1941), Canadian tennis player
 Kent E. Carpenter (fl. 1970s–2010s), professor of biological sciences
 Kerry Carpenter (born 1997), American baseball player
 Kip Carpenter (born 1979), American speed skater
 Kyle Carpenter (born 1989), Medal of Honor recipient for actions in combat in Operation Enduring Freedom

L
 Lant Carpenter (1780–1840), English educator and Unitarian minister
 Larry Carpenter (born 1948), American television soap opera director
 Lauren Carpenter, New York violinist, sister of David Aaron Carpenter
 Lea Carpenter (fl. 2000s–2010s), American writer and editor
 Lemuel Carpenter (c. 1808–1859), Anglo-American California pioneer
 Leonard Carpenter (born 1948), technical writer and author of fantasy and science fiction
 Leonard Carpenter (rower) (1902–1994), American Olympic rower
 Lester Carpenter (born 1970), Republican member of the Mississippi House of Representatives
 Levi D. Carpenter (1802–1856), United States Representative from New York
 Little Carpenter, nickname of Attakullakulla (c. 1708–1777), influential Cherokee leader and the tribe's First Beloved Man from 1761 to c. 1775
 Liz Carpenter (1920–2010), feminist writer, reporter, and public relations expert
 Loren Carpenter (born 1947), computer graphics researcher and developer
 Louisa d'Andelot Carpenter (1907–1976), du Pont heiress, Jazz Age socialite, and aviator
 Lucy Carpenter (born 1969), Professor of Physical Chemistry at the University of York and Director of the Cape Verde Atmospheric Observatory
 Lyn Carpenter (born 1965), English netball administrator and former player

M
 Malcolm Scott Carpenter, better known as Scott Carpenter (1925–2013), astronaut
 Malinda Carpenter (fl. 1990s–2020s), Fellow of the Royal Society of Edinburgh, child development psychology researcher
 Margaret Carpenter (born 1950), member of the North Carolina House of Representatives 2001–2002
 Margaret Sarah Carpenter (1793–1872), née Geddes, British artist
 Margaret Seymour Carpenter (1893–1987), novelist
 Marion Carpenter (1920–2002), White House news photographer
 Marion Carpenter Yazdi (1902–1996), Bahá'í writer
 Marnee Carpenter (born 1990), American actress
 Mary Carpenter (1807–1877), English educational and social reformer
 Mary Chapin Carpenter (born 1958), country music singer-songwriter
 Matt Carpenter (baseball) (born 1985), Major League Baseball third baseman
 Matt Carpenter (runner) (born 1964), American trail runner
 Matthew H. Carpenter (1824–1881), 19th century Republican Senator for Wisconsin
 Melanie Carpenter (1971–1995), abducted and murdered Canadian woman
 Meriva M. Carpenter (1802–1887), American artist
 Merlin Carpenter (born 1967), English artist
 Michael Carpenter (politician) (fl. 1840s–1850s), 19th-century mayor of Lancaster, Pennsylvania
 Michael Carpenter (tennis) (born 1936), Canadian tennis player 
 Michael E. Carpenter (born 1947), American lawyer and politician from Maine
 Moses Carpenter (1854–1889), Native American who died in England

N
 Nathanael Carpenter (1588/9?–1628), English author and geographer
 Nathaniel L. Carpenter (1805–1892), entrepreneur and businessman of antebellum Natchez, Mississippi
 Neil Carpenter (born 1944), Canadian pair skater
 Nicholas Carpenter (fl. 2000s–2010s), film director, son of Scott Carpenter
 Novella Carpenter (fl. 2000s–2010s), writer and gardener, or gardener and writer

P
 Patricia Carpenter (music theorist) (1923–2000), an American professor of music theory at Barnard College and Columbia University
 Patricia Carpenter (psychologist) (fl. 1990s–2000s), professor of psychology at Carnegie Mellon University
 Paul Carpenter (actor) (1921–1964), Canadian actor and singer
 Paul Carpenter (baseball), minor league baseball player
 Paul B. Carpenter (1928–2002), Californian politician
 Percy Carpenter (1820–1895), British artist
 Philip Herbert Carpenter (1852–1891), 19th Century British naturalist
 Philip Pearsall Carpenter (1819–1877), malacologist
 Philo Carpenter (1805–1886), Chicago's first pharmacist, and an outspoken abolitionist
 Preston Carpenter (1934–2011), American football player

R
 R. R. M. Carpenter (1877–1949), American business executive
 R. R. M. Carpenter Jr. (1915–1990), owner and club president of the Philadelphia Phillies
 Ralph Carpenter (1909–2009), expert on Colonial American design
 Ramsey Carpenter-Bearse (born 1990), Miss Kentucky 2014, competitor for the title of Miss America 2015
 Randolph Carpenter (1894–1956), U.S. Representative from Kansas
 Rene Carpenter (1928–2020), American newspaper columnist and television host
 Rhys Carpenter (1889–1980), classical art historian and professor at Bryn Mawr College
 Rita (Carpenter) Jenrette (born 1949), better known Rita Jenrette American celebrity, actor, television journalist, and real estate executive
 Rolla C. Carpenter (1852–1919), American engineer
 Rollo Carpenter (born 1965), creator of Jabberwacky AI software
 Ron Carpenter (defensive back) (born 1970), American football player
 Ron Carpenter (defensive lineman) (born 1948), American football player
 Ron Carpenter (designer) (born 1950), British type designer 
 Ruly Carpenter (1940–2021), principal owner and club president of the Philadelphia Phillies
 Russell Carpenter (born 1950), American cinematographer
 Ryan Carpenter (born 1991), American professional ice hockey center
 Ryan Carpenter (baseball) (born 1990), American professional baseball pitcher

S
 Sabrina Carpenter (born 1999), actress and singer
 Scott Carpenter (1925–2013), Mercury program astronaut and aquanaut
 Scott Carpenter (water polo) (born 1988), British water polo player
 Sean Carpenter, New York violinist, brother of David Aaron Carpenter
 Shawn Carpenter (fl. 2000s), American Navy veteran
 Shelt Carpenter (1862–1937), West Virginia outdoorsman and fiddle player
 Simon Carpenter (fl. 2000s–2010s), British entomologist
 Stanley Jennings Carpenter (1904–1984), US Army colonel and medical entomologist
 Steve Carpenter (born 1971), Canadian ice hockey defenceman
 Steve Carpenter (American football) (born 1958), American football defensive back
 Sue Carpenter (born 1956), former UK TV presenter
 Susan Carpenter (fl. 1990s–2010s), American writer and pirate radio personality

T
 Tariq Carpenter (born 1998), American football player
 Teresa Carpenter (born 1948), Pulitzer-prize-winning American author
 Terry Carpenter (1900–1978), Nebraska politician
 Thelma Carpenter (1922–1997), jazz singer and actress
 Thelma Carpenter (billiards player) (1911–1986), English billiards and snooker player
 Theodore Carpenter (1898–1975), jazz musician
 Tim Carpenter (born 1960), Democrat member of the Wisconsin Senate

V
 Vivian Carpenter (born 1952), accounting academic and business executive

W
 Walker Carpenter (1893–1956), American football tackle for John Heisman's Georgia Tech Golden Tornado
 Walter Cecil Carpenter (1834–1904), born Walter Cecil Talbot, Royal Navy officer 
 Walter Randolph Carpenter (1877–1954), Australian-Canadian entrepreneur, businessman and philanthropist
 Walter S. Carpenter Jr. (1888–1976), American corporate executive
 Warren L. Carpenter (1931–2003), US Air Force flight surgeon
 Warren William Carpenter, nicknamed Hick Carpenter, (1855–1937), American Major League Baseball third baseman 
 Wendi B. Carpenter (born 1956), Rear Admiral, U.S. Navy
 Willie C. Carpenter (fl. 1970s–2020s), American actor

Z

Families
The Carpenters, 20th century American singing duo
The Carpenters (violinists), three sibling violinists

Fictional characters

No first name
 Dr. Carpenter, British spy in Ice Station Zebra (novel)
 "Mr. Carpenter", alias of Klaatu (The Day the Earth Stood Still) in the film The Day the Earth Stood Still
 The Carpenter family, a protagonist family line in the 1987 novel Sarum
 The Carpenter Clan, focuses on a group of women in the 1996 novel Shadow Ranch by Jo-Ann Mapson

A
 Andy Carpenter, the lead character in a series of mystery books by David Rosenfelt (author)
 Atticus Carpenter, the overriding antagonist in Insurrection (StarCraft)

B
 Bop Carpenter, patriarch of the Carpenter family clan in Jo-Ann Mapson's novel Shadow Ranch

C
 Cassie Carpenter, from EastEnders

D
 Derek Carpenter, in the 2010 television film Mothman

E
 Lieutenant Elroy Carpenter, on the television show McHale's Navy

G
 Dr. Guy Carpenter, physicist protagonist of A Hole in Texas
 Guy Carpenter from Neighbours

H
 Hannah Carpenter, in EastEnders

J
 Jack Carpenter, main character in a series of books by James Swain
 Jake Carpenter, main character from Pirate Diary: The Journal of Jake Carpenter by Richard Platt
 Joe Carpenter, protagonist of the novel Sole Survivor
 Dr. John Carpenter, the main character played by Elvis Presley in the 1969 musical drama film Change of Habit.
 Joseph Carpenter, codenamed "Joker", supporting character from the Read or Die series of novels, manga, and anime

K
 Kelvin Carpenter, from EastEnders

L
 Lauren Carpenter, in the Australian soap opera Neighbours
 Lou Carpenter, from Neighbours
 Louise Carpenter, in Neighbours

M
 Meg Carpenter, a genre fiction ghostwriter, book reviewer, and writing coach in the 2010 novel Our Tragic Universe by Scarlett Thomas
 Michael Carpenter, a major side character in The Dresden Files book series by Jim Butcher

N 
 Nora Carpenter, in the American horror movie Final Destination 2

O
 O Be Joyful Carpenter, a Puritan character in the 1997 novel London

P
 Patsy Carpenter, the main character of the 1970 novel Moving On by Larry McMurtry
 Patsy Carpenter, a character in Terms of Endearment

S
 Sabina Carpenter, widow of a Pinkerton detective in Bill Pronzini's 1890s Western detective short story collection Carpenter and Quincannon, Professional Detective Services

T
 Tony Carpenter, from EastEnders

Z
 Zoe Carpenter, in the soap opera Hollyoaks

See also
 
 
Admiral Carpenter (disambiguation)
General Carpenter (disambiguation)
Governor Carpenter (disambiguation)
Justice Carpenter (disambiguation)
Senator Carpenter (disambiguation)
 Carpentier, a Norman-Picard surname
 Carpintero, a Spanish surname
 Charpentier, a French-language surname
 Zimmerman (surname) and Zimmermann, German surnames of occupational origin

References

English-language surnames
Occupational surnames
Lists of people by surname